Terrence Andrew Davis (December 15, 1969 – August 11, 2018) was an American programmer who created and designed TempleOS, a public domain operating system. Its development was an extremely complex, time-consuming and unusual undertaking for one person.

As a teenager, Davis learned assembly language on a Commodore 64. He later earned a master's degree in electrical engineering from Arizona State University and worked for several years at Ticketmaster as a programmer for VAX machines. In 1996, he began experiencing regular manic episodes, one of which led him to hospitalization. Initially diagnosed with bipolar disorder, he was later declared to have schizophrenia. He subsequently collected disability payments and resided in Las Vegas with his parents until 2017.

Davis grew up as a Catholic and was an atheist for some of his adult life. After experiencing a self-described "revelation", he proclaimed that he had been in direct communication with God and that God had commanded him to build a successor to the Second Temple. He then committed a decade to creating an operating system modeled after the DOS-based interfaces of his youth. In 2013, Davis announced that he had completed the project, now called "TempleOS". The operating system was generally regarded as a hobby system, not suitable for general use, but Davis received sympathy and support for bringing the project to fruition.

During his final years, Davis amassed an online following and regularly posted video blogs to social media. Although he remained lucid when discussing computer-related subjects, his communication skills were significantly affected by his schizophrenia. He was controversial for his regular use of slurs, which he explained was his way of combating factors of psychological warfare. After 2017, he struggled with periods of homelessness and incarceration. In 2018, he was struck by a train and died at the age of 48.

Early life and career

Terrence Andrew Davis was born in West Allis, Wisconsin, later moving to Washington, Michigan, California and Arizona. He was the seventh of eight children, and his father was an industrial engineer. As a child, Davis used an Apple II at his elementary school, and as a teenager, learned assembly language on a Commodore 64. He earned a master's degree in electrical engineering from Arizona State University in 1994 and worked for several years at Ticketmaster as a programmer for VAX machines. On the subject of his certifications, he wrote in 2011: "Everybody knows electrical is higher in the engineering pecking order than CS because it requires real math ;-) I'm a rocket scientist, though, not a very good one".

Onset of illness and spiritual awakening

Davis grew up Catholic, but was an atheist for some of his adult life before experiencing what he called a "revelation from God". Starting in 1996, Davis was admitted to a psychiatric ward approximately every six months due to reoccurring manic episodes. In March, he had begun experiencing regular manic episodes and developed delusions centering around space aliens and government agents. According to Davis, he attributed a profound quality to the Rage Against the Machine lyric "some of those that work forces are the same that burn crosses" and recalled "I started seeing people following me around in suits and stuff. It just seemed something was strange." He started donating large sums of money to charity organizations, something he had never done before. Later, he surmised, "that act [probably] caused God to reveal Himself to me and saved me."

Soon afterward, out of fear of the suited figures he believed to be following him, Davis left town and drove hundreds of miles south with no destination. After becoming convinced that his car radio was communicating with him, he dismantled his vehicle (apparently in a search for tracking devices he believed were hidden on it) and threw his keys into the desert. He walked aimlessly along the side of the highway, where he was then picked up by an officer. Davis escaped from the patrol vehicle, broke his collarbone, and was then taken to a hospital. Distressed about a conversation over artifacts found on his X-ray scans, interpreted by him as "alien artifacts", he ran from the hospital and attempted to carjack a nearby truck before being arrested. In jail, he stripped himself, broke his glasses and jammed the frames into a nearby electrical outlet, trying to open his cell door by switching the breaker. This failed, as he had been wearing non-conductive frames. He was then admitted to a mental hospital for two weeks.

Regarding these developments, Davis said in a 2014 interview that he had been "genuinely pretty crazy in a way. Now I'm not. I'm crazy in a different way maybe." Davis acknowledged that the sequence of events leading to his spiritual awakening might give the impression of "mental illness, as opposed to some glorious revelation from God. [...] It would sound polite if you said I scared myself thinking about quantum computers. And then I guess you just throw in your ordinary mental illness." Reflecting on the initial episode, he said, "I'm not especially proud of the logic and thinking. It looks very young and childish and pathetic. [...] In the Bible it says if you seek God, He will be found of you. I was really seeking, and I was looking everywhere to see what he might be saying to me."

Davis was initially diagnosed with bipolar disorder and later declared to have schizophrenia. Afterward, he felt "guilty for being such a technology-advocate atheist" and sought to emulate Jesus by giving away all his possessions and living a nomadic lifestyle. In July 1996, he returned to Arizona and started formulating plans for a new business. He designed a three-axis milling machine, as he recalled having 3D printing in mind as an obvious pursuit. An incident involving a Dremel tool nearly set his apartment on fire, which caused him to abandon the idea. He subsequently lived with his parents in Las Vegas and collected Social Security disability payments.

After 2003, Davis' hospitalizations became less frequent. His schizophrenia still affected his communication skills, and his online comments were usually incomprehensible. However, he was reported as "always lucid" if the topic was about computers. Vice noted that, in 2012, he had a productive conversation with the contributors at MetaFilter, where his work was introduced as "an operating system written by a schizophrenic programmer".

TempleOS

TempleOS (known as "J Operating System" from 2004 to 2005, "LoseThos" from 2006 to early 2012, and "SparrowOS" in late 2012) is an operating system similar to the Commodore 64, DESQview and other early DOS-based interfaces. It was conceived by Davis in the early 2000s and developed alone over the course of a decade. This included the design of its original programming language, editor, compiler and kernel. It was ultimately composed of over 100,000 lines of code.

In 2005, Davis stated that his ambition for the J Operating System was "to recreate the dynamic environment that used to exist when the Commodore 64 was around and everyone was creating odd-ball software". He envisioned the system as a Commodore 64 with a "thousand times" more powerful processing speed. Three years later, he wrote that the primary purpose of LoseThos was "for making video games. It has no networking or Internet support. As far as I'm concerned, that would be reinventing the wheel".

Davis later proclaimed that he was in direct communication with God, and that God told him to build a successor to the Second Temple as an operating system. As such, references to Biblical tropes are ubiquitous in the OS. One bundled program, "After Egypt", is a game in which the player travels to a burning bush to use a "high-speed stopwatch". The stopwatch is meant to act as an oracle that generates pseudo-random text, something Davis believed to be coded messages from God. He likened the process to a Ouija board and speaking in tongues. An example of generated text follows:

According to Davis, many of the system's features, such as its 640×480 resolution and 16-color display, were also explicit instructions from God. The charter on his website stated that TempleOS was "God's official temple. Just like Solomon's Temple, this is a community focal point where offerings are made and God's oracle is consulted". He used the oracle to ask God about war ("servicemen competing"), death ("awful"), dinosaurs ("Brontosaurs' feet hurt when stepped"), favorite video game (Donkey Kong), favorite car (BMW), favorite national anthem (Latvia's), favorite band (the Beatles), and the 11th commandment ("Thou shall not litter").

In 2012, Davis stated that LoseThos was downloaded 10,000 times since 2009, and that there was "no evidence anyone has installed it. I am in a CIA prison." Later in the year, he renamed LoseThos to "SparrowOS", and in early 2013, rebranded again as "TempleOS". A few weeks later, his website announced: "God's temple is finished. Now, God kills CIA until it spreads".

Recognition, controversy and following

Davis believed that he was under constant subjugation by federal agents, particularly those from the Central Intelligence Agency. He was controversial for his regular use of offensive slurs, including racist and homophobic epithets, and sometimes rebuked his critics as "CIA niggers".

Online, Davis would frequently communicate in randomly generated blocks of text and off-topic declarations about God, which led to bans from websites including Something Awful, Reddit, and Hacker News. However, the critical reception to TempleOS was mostly favorable, as tech journalist David Cassel wrote, "programming websites tried to find the necessary patience and understanding to accommodate Davis". TechRepublic and OSNews published positive articles on Davis' work, even though he had been banned from OSNews for hostile comments targeting its readers and staff.

Such outbursts, along with the operating system's "amateurish" presentation, ultimately caused TempleOS to become a frequent object of derision. Davis explained that his use of the word "nigger" was a reaction to being subject to psychological warfare tactics from media agencies such as the BBC. He addressed concerns about his language on his website: 

Once TempleOS was completed, most of Davis' time was spent online, "coding, web surfing, or using the output from the National Institute of Standards and Technology randomness beacon to talk to God", and he drew a small fanbase following through his various online activities. He posted hours of video blogs and would refer to himself as "the smartest programmer that's ever lived" while showing his creations. His YouTube channels were repeatedly banned due to his vulgarities. In 2017, the OS was shown as a part of an outsider art exhibition in Bourogne, France. Davis said he was happy to receive the attention but was disappointed that few of his fans had used the OS to speak to God.

In September 2018, OSNews editor Thom Holwerda wrote: "Davis was clearly a gifted programmer – writing an entire operating system is no small feat – and it was sad to see him affected by his mental illness". One fan described him as a "programming legend", while another, a computer engineer, compared the development of TempleOS to a one-man-built skyscraper. The engineer had previously spoken to Davis at length and believed that Davis, had it not been for his illness, could have been a "Steve Jobs" or a "Steve Wozniak". He added that it "actually boggles my mind that one man wrote all that" and surmised that it may be difficult for a layperson to understand how extraordinary it was to write an entire operating system alone.

Death

During his final months, Davis struggled with periods of homelessness and incarceration. He stopped taking medication because he believed that it limited his creativity. Some fans helped him by bringing him supplies, but he refused their housing offers. After living with his sister in Arizona, Davis traveled to California, and in April 2018, stopped in Portland, Oregon. Local police were informed that Davis may be a threat, since he had stated a willingness to kill if asked by God. In June, Portland police informed officials in the nearby town of The Dalles that they had received word that Davis may be headed there. No further complaints were received about Davis.

In his final video, recorded on a bench at the Dalles Wasco County Library and uploaded hours before his death, he explained that he had removed most of his videos because he did not wish to "litter" the Internet, and that he had learned how to "purify" himself. At the very end, he states: "It's good to be king. Wait, maybe. I think maybe I'm just like a little bizarre little person who walks back and forth. Whatever, you know, but..."

On the evening of August 11, 2018, while walking alongside railroad tracks in The Dalles, Oregon, Davis was struck and killed by a Union Pacific train. Investigators could not determine whether his death was suicide or accidental, although the train engineer believed his death to be a suicide. The police report stated that Davis was walking with his back toward the train and that he turned around before the moment of impact. When The Dalles Chronicle ran a story about an unnamed homeless man who was struck by a train, the newspaper was inundated with phone calls inquiring whether it was Davis, which the paper later confirmed in a follow-up piece.

Tributes

As reports of his death surfaced online, he was memorialized by fans in a number of tributes posted to social media. Through the TempleOS website, his family asked people to donate to "organizations working to ease the pain and suffering caused by mental illness". In December 2018, Linux.org (an unofficial community for Linux users) was vandalized by hackers to include a reference to his death. In November 2019, Davis was the subject of a 30-minute documentary on BBC Radio 4. Youtuber Fredrik Knudsen produced a documentary on Davis as part of the "Down the Rabbit Hole" series.

See also

 Creativity and mental health
 Religion and schizophrenia

References
Notes

Citations

External links

 TempleOS Website
  Archive of the TempleOS website and operating system
 
 

1969 births
2018 deaths
Converts to Christianity from atheism or agnosticism
American computer programmers
American Roman Catholics
American Christians
Arizona State University alumni
Railway accident deaths in the United States
People with schizophrenia
Outsider artists
Homeless people
American male bloggers
American bloggers
Video bloggers
People from West Allis, Wisconsin
Critics of atheism